Aakash P Parkar (born 20 May 1994) is a cricket player from Mumbai. He made his T20 debut for Mumbai on 1 April 2015 against Odisha. He made his List A debut for Mumbai for 2017–18 Vijay Hazare Trophy on 5 February 2018 and for 2017–18 Ranji Trophy on Oct 14, 2017 against Madhya Pradesh cricket team in Indore.

References 

1994 births
Living people
Indian cricketers
Place of birth missing (living people)
Mumbai cricketers